Simisola Olayemi Onibuwe Johnson (1929 – 2000) was a Nigerian dentist and women's advocate who served as Minister for Social Development and Culture during the nation's second republic. Johnson and Grace Guobadia both qualified as dentists in 1957, making them the first trained female dentists in Nigeria. Johnson was also a chair of Allied Bank and the Lagos State branch of the National Council of Women Societies, and a fellow of the National Postgraduate Medical College of Nigeria.

Life
Johnson was born in Lagos Island to the family of Alfred Latunde and Harriet Susan Johnson (née Crowther Nichol). She was the last born of her parents. Her father was a lawyer and a founding director of National Bank of Nigeria in 1933, her maternal great-great-grandfather was Ajayi Crowther, while her great-grand-uncle was Herbert Macaulay. Johnson was educated at CMS Girl's School Lagos. From 1954 to 1957, she attended Sunderland Technical College and Durham University qualifying as a dentist. She and fellow Nigerian, Grace Guobadia, graduated in the same year, becoming the first two trained female dentists in the country. Johnson earned a Bachelor of Dental Surgery degree and Guobadia a Licentiate in Dental Surgery. Johnson later attended Royal College of Surgeons, Glasgow to become an orthodontist. In the process, she became Nigeria's first female orthodontist to practice in the country.

In Nigeria, she worked with the federal government rising to become the Chief Consultant, Dentistry in the Federal Ministry of Health.  Johnson started work with the government on 14 July 1958 as a dental surgeon where she worked at the General Hospital, Lagos from 1958 to the early 1960s. As a dentist, she played an important role in the development of the field in Nigeria. In 1962, she was a pioneer member of the Nigerian Dental Association. She was an associate lecturer in dentistry with the University of Lagos during its developmental years and was the principal of the Federal School of Dental Hygiene and Technology. In 1983, she was nominated as the Minister of Social Development and Culture.

Gender rights
Johnson was among a set of pioneer women's rights advocates with a deep sense of dedication to their family, work and women's right but were also criticized as predominantly members of the elite class in Nigeria. During the Shagari administration, Johnson became the Minister for Social Development. In the second republic, she was heavily involved in the inter-sectoral national committee on women's development, a committee given the mandate to establish a working relationship between the government and other women's organizations in the country. After the Shagari administration, Johnson continued to play an advisory role on gender affairs. In 1985, she was head of Nigeria's delegation to the Third World Conference on Women, held in Nairobi, Kenya. Part of the recommendations of the conference was for member nations to eliminate discrimination against women and adopt strategies that will include the participation of women in effort to promote development. Johnson was the head of the women's advisory committee, charged to make recommendations to the Babangida's administration about strategies to increase women's participation in government. The committee among other things recommended the creation of a Ministry for Women's Affairs. The ministry did not came into being until 1989 with the establishment of the National Commission for Women supported by Maryam Babangida.

References

Sources

Nigerian women activists
Nigerian women academics
Yoruba women academics
Nigerian women medical doctors
Yoruba women physicians
Abiodun family
Academic staff of the University of Lagos
Physicians from Lagos
Yoruba women activists
Yoruba women in politics
20th-century Nigerian medical doctors
Orthodontists
20th-century Nigerian politicians
CMS Grammar School, Lagos alumni
History of women in Lagos
20th-century Nigerian women politicians
1929 births
2000 deaths
Nigerian women's rights activists
Federal ministers of Nigeria
Politicians from Lagos
Educators from Lagos
Women government ministers of Nigeria
20th-century Nigerian women
20th-century women physicians
Alumni of King's College, Newcastle
St Anne's School, Ibadan alumni
20th-century dentists